The common name blue-tailed trogon can refer to more than one species of bird in the trogon family:

Javan trogon (Apalharpactes reinwardtii) and Sumatran trogon (Apalharpactes mackloti); formerly considered to be a single species.
Chocó trogon (Trogon comptus).